New York City FC is an American professional soccer team based in New York City. The club was founded in 2013 as a Major League Soccer expansion franchise, playing its first games in 2015.

This list encompasses the various records and statistics associated with the team's competitive performances since inception and their record attendances. The player records section includes details of the club's leading goalscorers, goalkeepers, coaches, and those who have made most appearances in first-team competitions.

Player records

Appearances 
Youngest Player: Joseph Scally, 15 years, 157 days (against New York Red Bulls, U.S. Open Cup, June 6, 2018)
Oldest Player: Andrea Pirlo, 38 years, 170 days (against Columbus Crew, Major League Soccer, November 5, 2017)
As of October 31, 2022 (All competitive matches, included the 2 games of the "MLS is Back Tournament" knockout stage in 2020): 

Bold signifies a current New York City player

Goalscorers 
 Most goals scored in all competitions: 80 – David Villa
 Most goals scored in Major League Soccer: 77 – David Villa
 Most goals scored in MLS Cup Playoffs: 3 - David Villa, Valentín Castellanos
 Most goals scored in US Open Cup: 2 – Kwadwo Poku, Keaton Parks
 Youngest goalscorer: 19 years, 2 months, 20 days – Talles Magno
 Oldest goalscorer: 38 years, 1 month, 17 days – Frank Lampard

As of October 31, 2022 (all competitive matches):

Included the goals (2 Medina, 1 Castellanos and 1 Moralez) in the 2 games of the knockout stage in the "MLS is Back Tournament" in 2020.
Bold signifies a current New York City player.

Shutouts 
As of September 29, 2019 (all competitive matches):

Bold signifies a current New York City player

Coaching records

List of seasons 

1. Avg. attendance include statistics from league matches only.

International results

By competition

By club
 (Includes CONCACAF Champions League)

By country
 (Includes CONCACAF Champions League)

Transfer records

Highest transfer fees paid

Highest transfer fees received

Designated Players

  Maximiliano Moralez
  Frank Lampard 
  Andrea Pirlo
  Jesús Medina
  Alexandru Mitriță
  David Villa

Bold signifies a current New York City player

Notes

References

New York City FC
New York City FC
New York City FC records and statistics